Bernard Joseph Archard (20 August 1916 – 1 May 2008) was an English actor who made many film and television appearances.

Early life and career
Archard was born in Fulham, London, where his father Alfred James Aloysius who was born in Marylebone was a jeweller. Bernard's paternal grandfather Alfred Charles Archard and great grandfather Henry Archard were clockmakers, watchmakers and jewellers in Mayfair, London during the 1800s. He was the maternal grandson of James Matthew Littleboy, Mayor of Fulham, 1906–07. He attended the Royal Academy of Dramatic Art  and in summer 1939 he appeared in the Open Air Theatre, Regent's Park, London, production of Twelfth Night. As a conscientious objector during the Second World War, he worked on Quaker land.

I==Television==
Archard's first major television role, reprising the like-titled radio show, was playing Lt Col. Oreste Pinto in the BBC wartime drama series Spycatcher, which ran for four seasons between 1959 and 1961. His TV guest appearances   include two roles in Doctor Who; as Bragen in The Power of the Daleks and as Marcus Scarman in Pyramids of Mars, a regular role in Emmerdale; plus appearances in The Children of the New Forest (the 1964 BBC edition), Dixon of Dock Green, Danger Man,  The Avengers, Z-Cars, Paul Temple, Upstairs, Downstairs, Callan, Rumpole of the Bailey, Crown Court, The Professionals, Bergerac, Sir Francis Drake TV series and Keeping Up Appearances.

Film
He appeared in over fifty films, including Village of the Damned (1960), The List of Adrian Messenger (1963), Play Dirty (1968), Run a Crooked Mile (1969), The Horror of Frankenstein (1970), Roman Polanski's Macbeth (1971), Dad's Army (1971), The Day of the Jackal (1973), The Sea Wolves (1980), Krull (1983) and King Solomon's Mines (1985).

Stage
Archard and his long term partner, James Belchamber, ran a touring repertory company, based in Torquay, which included Hilda Braid among its players. On the West End stage he appeared at Her Majesty's Theatre as a magistrate in the Terence Rattigan play Cause Célèbre and in The Case of the Oily Levantine by Anthony Shaffer.

Filmography

References

External links
 
 Obituary at The Independent
 Obituary at The Guardian
 Obituary at The Times

1916 births
2008 deaths
English conscientious objectors
English male film actors
English male television actors
English gay actors
People from Fulham
English LGBT actors
Alumni of RADA
20th-century English LGBT people
21st-century English LGBT people